Weed Bus was the first ep released by Liverpool band The Stairs. The ep was issued in several formats: CD ep; 7" vinyl single; 12" vinyl 45rpm single with picture sleeve; 12" 45rpm vinyl DJ promo single with a plain black sleeve. The matrix of Side A on the 7" vinyl single has Mexican R'N'B inscribed on it, while Side B has Goodbye Sister Disco inscribed. Both 12" vinyl single formats have Don't mess with the Tank inscribed in the matrix on Side A, and Dave Quicksilver and The Blues Messengers inscribed on Side B. The cover art photograph was taken by David Maguire, brother to band member Paul Maguire.

UK 7" - Go!Disc 7" - GOD 63
Side A
 Weed Bus
 Take No Notice Of The World Outside
Side B
 Flying Machine
 When It All Goes Wrong

UK 12" - Go!Disc 12" - GODX 63
Side A
 Weed Bus
 Take No Notice Of The World Outside
Side B
 Flying Machine
 When It All Goes Wrong

UK CD - Go!Disc CDS - GODCD 63
 Weed Bus
 Take No Notice Of The World Outside
 Flying Machine
 When It All Goes Wrong

References

The Stairs albums
1991 EPs